= Munira Ibrahim Al Sabii =

Bahraini poet, active 2010–Present

Munira Ibrahim Al Sabir
- Occupation: Poet
- Years active: 2010–present
- Notable work: Poetic Lights; Poets of the Million

Munira Ibrahim Al Sabii is a Bahraini poet and a member of the Popular Poetry Society in the Kingdom of Bahrain. She published two collections of poetry (Diwan). The first single title “Poetic Lights” (Original title: manayir sherya) included a number of Munira's poems. The second collection was shared and had works of a number of other female poets and was issued under the title “Poets of The Million” (Original title: shaeirat almilyuni) by The Academy of Poetry in the Committee of Management of Festivals and Cultural and Heritage Programs in Abu Dhabi, as well as her study "The role of the new media in promoting cultural exchange between Arab peoples: the Arab Gulf states as a model" (Original title: dawr al'iielam aljadid fi taeziz altabadul althaqafii bayn alshueub alearabiati: dual alkhalij alearabii anmwdhjan) .

== Early life and education ==
Munira Ibrahim Al-Subaie received her doctorate degree with distinction, with honors, from the Faculty of Arts, specializing in Linguistics, Communication and Translation, from Abdelmalek Al-Saadi University, Kingdom of Morocco, in the city of Tetouan for her study and research which was issued under the title “The Role of New Media in Promoting Cultural Exchange between Arab Peoples.” The Arab Gulf States as a Model” in which she achieved a degree of excellence in presenting the topic. In this research, Munira dealt with the cultural exchange of popular culture, specifically through YouTube on the analytical side. As for the field side, she touched on the new media and its role in promoting cultural exchange on the Gulf cultural elites in particular.

The study concluded in its results that the “intellectual elites” in the Arab Gulf states tend to use the new media frequently and are keen on cultural, popular and folkloric contents, and that the “intellectual elite” is charactertized by its interest in culture, history, heritage and folklore from electronic sources such as social networking sites, as the study - carried out by Munira - proved that what most expressed the opinions of the people about culture in the Arab Gulf states is the interest of the governments of the Arab Gulf states in culture and heritage, as the new media contribute to cultural education as she described it.

== Career ==
The poetic collection (Diwan) “Poetic Lights” is regarded as the first and most famous work of the poet Munira Ibrahim Al-Sabii. The Diwan contains many diverse poetic poems, and it was dedicated to the poet Abdul Rahman Rafie, who Munira said that the credit is due to him because of the great impact he created in the development of her poetic and literary career. The Bahraini poet has another work which was a collaboration that was published under the title “The Million Poets” by The Academy of Poetry in the Committee of Management of Festivals and Cultural and Heritage Programs in Abu Dhabi. This book included the poetic works of 13 female poets who had previously participated in the “Million’s Poet” TV show, including Munira Ibrahim Al-Sabii. The book highlighted the women poets who participated in the competition, which aimed to revive Nabati poetry and present it in all visual, audio and print media.

== Opinions ==
Munira Al-Sabii accredits what she writes in her poems to what she calls the multiple dimensions of life. She also believes that female poets in the Arab Gulf countries get a great attention in the field of culture, poetry and literature, believing that desire in the advancement of the literary heritage has no limits. She also believes that poetry has opened a great way to attend public and major literary events, and has also allowed many poetic talents, and believes that development and openness to other Arab cultures have allowed cultural exchange in the field of poetry, heritage and art.

As for Munira, as she mentioned in a press interview, what affects her most is nostalgia, for the past, for the memories, and that is during and while writing poetry so she believes that the poet needs to nourish the soul and the mind to present new ideas that poetry lovers would like. Munira admires women's poetic gatherings, which in her opinion bear the nature of privacy, and even bears an aspect in exchanging the women's experience of many poets.

== Works ==
This is a list of the most prominent works of the Bahraini poet Munira Ibrahim Al-Subaie:

- “Poetic Lights” (Original title: manayir sherya)
- Poets of the Million (Original title: shaeirat almilyuni)
- The role of the new media in promoting cultural exchange between Arab peoples: the Arab Gulf states as a model (Original title: dawr al'iielam aljadid fi taeziz altabadul althaqafii bayn alshueub alearabiati: dual alkhalij alearabii anmwdhjan)
